The Hillcrest Primary School Incident was a fatal accident at the Hillcrest Primary School in Devonport, Tasmania, in which 6 children died and 3 were injured during end-of-year celebrations on the morning of 16 December 2021.

Accident
The accident took place at Hillcrest Primary School during its Big Day In end-of-year celebrations, and was the last scheduled school day of the year for students. The school had numerous activities on site, including a jumping castle and inflatable zorb balls. At around 10 am, a gust of wind lifted the jumping castle and inflatable balls into the air, causing the children to fall from a distance of around ten metres. The school was soon closed and parents asked to collect their children "as a matter of urgency".

Victims
Five children died at the time of the incident, and a sixth child, Chace Harrison, died from his injuries 3 days later, on 19 December 2021. Three children were severely injured, but recovered.

The families of the six children who died gave permission for news sources to identify the children by name:

 Addison Stewart (age 11)
 Zane Mellor (age 12) 
 Jye Sheehan (age 12) 
 Jalailah Jayne-Maree Jones (age 12) 
 Peter Dodt (age 12)
 Chace Harrison (age 11)

Funds
Following the event, a substantial amount of resources were given to fund counselling services to children, first responders, teachers and other members of the school community, including $800,000 announced by Prime Minister, Scott Morrison, during his visit to the site on 18 December. A local Devonport resident, Zoe Smith, set up a GoFundMe page for donations to the Hillcrest Community Fund. The GoFundMe raised over $1.4 million.

Criticisms
Due to legal issues, no funds were released to families of victims until 4 months later, in March 2022. This was the subject of much criticism from community members, including Georgie Gardam, mother of victim Zane Mellor, who accused the Devonport City Council of ignoring families of the victims.

The event resulted in numerous organisations banning the use of all inflatables on their property, including the Tasmanian Department of Education, who announced the ban shortly after the accident.

References 

Devonport, Tasmania
Events in Tasmania
December 2021 events in Australia
Accidental deaths in Tasmania
Disasters in Tasmania